Con la música en el alma  (English language:With the Music in my Soul) is a 1951 Argentine musical film directed by Luis Bayón Herrera and written by Carlos A. Petit. The tango film stars Francisco Canaro (also the producer) and Olga Casares Pearson.

Cast
Jaime Andrada
Alberto Arenas
Olga Casares Pearson
Irma Denás
Ramón Garay
Marga Landova
Tito Lusiardo
Andrés Poggio 'Toscanito'
Alberto Rudoy

References

External links
 

1951 films
1951 musical films
1950s Spanish-language films
Tango films
Argentine black-and-white films
Films directed by Luis Bayón Herrera
1950s dance films
Argentine musical films
1950s Argentine films